F-box-like/WD repeat-containing protein TBL1XR1 is a protein that in humans is encoded by the TBL1XR1 gene. The protein encoded by this gene has sequence similarity with members of the WD40 repeat-containing protein family. The WD40 group is a large family of proteins that appear to have a regulatory function. It is believed that the WD40 repeats mediate protein–protein interactions, and members of the family are involved in signal transduction, RNA processing, gene regulation, vesicular trafficking, cytoskeletal assembly and may play a role in the control of cytotypic differentiation.

Clinical significance 
Mutations in TBL1XR1 cause Pierpont syndrome, which involves intellectual disability, a characteristic facial appearance and limb abnormalities.

Mutations in TBL1XR1 have been identified in lymphomas, including MYD88 wild-type Waldenstrom's macroglobulinemia.

In prostate cancer, somatic copy-number gains (CNA) in TBL1XR1 are present in around 15% of patients with localised disease, co-occurring with adjacent megagene NAALADL2. The frequency of CNA gains in these genes associate with a number of clinical features of aggressive prostate cancer including high Gleason grade, tumour stage, positive surgical margins and cancer which has spread to the lymph nodes. The frequency of copy-number gains in this genetic region also increase in castrate resistant and neuroendocrine prostate cancer.

The region surrounding TBL1XR1 is rich in oncogenes. Copy-number gains in TBL1XR1 often co-occur with neighbouring oncogenes including: BCL6, ATR and PI3K family members. Copy-number gains at the DNA level associate with mRNA expression changes in more than 450 known oncogenes, suggesting this region may be important in driving aggressive prostate cancer. TBL1XR1 is a co-activator of the androgen receptor, a major hormone receptor driving prostate cancer development. Of the genes whose expression was altered between patients with and without gains, 506 (14.09%) of the genes were androgen-regulated or contained an AR binding site.

Interactions 

TBL1XR1 has been shown to interact with nuclear receptor co-repressor 1.

References

Further reading